Swordsman II, also known as The Legend of the Swordsman, is a 1992 Hong Kong wuxia film very loosely adapted from Louis Cha's novel The Smiling, Proud Wanderer. It was the second part of a trilogy: preceded by The Swordsman (1990) and followed by The East Is Red (1993). Directed by Ching Siu-tung, Swordsman II starred Jet Li, Brigitte Lin, Rosamund Kwan and Michelle Reis in the leading roles. None of the original cast from the previous film return except Fennie Yuen.

Plot
Linghu Chong, Yue Lingshan and members of the Mount Hua School are planning to retire from the jianghu (martial artists' community). They learn that Dongfang Bubai has seized control of the Sun Moon Holy Cult and is secretly plotting with some Japanese rōnin to rebel against the Ming Empire and dominate China. Dongfang Bubai had castrated himself in order to master the skills in the Sunflower Manual, and his appearance has become more feminine, even though he is now a formidable martial artist.

Linghu Chong meets Dongfang Bubai by chance without knowing his true identity, mistakes him for a beautiful young woman, and falls in love with "her". Dongfang Bubai knocks out Linghu Chong while he is not looking and imprisons him in an underground dungeon. In the dungeon, by coincidence, Linghu Chong meets Ren Woxing, Ren Yingying's father and the former leader of the Sun Moon Holy Cult. They escape from captivity together. One night, while Linghu Chong is distracted by Dongfang Bubai's lover Shishi, Dongfang tracks down his Mount Hua School fellows and kills them.

Linghu Chong brings Yue Lingshan, Ren Yingying, Ren Woxing and Xiang Wentian with him to confront Dongfang Bubai at Black Woods Cliff. In the ensuing battle, Dongfang Bubai apparently dies after refusing Linghu Chong's help and falling off the cliff. Ren Woxing regains control of the cult and starts killing the traitors who defected to Dongfang Bubai. Linghu Chong and Yue Lingshan secretly escape with help from Xiang Wentian and Ren Yingying because they know that Ren Woxing cannot tolerate them.

Cast

 Jet Li as Linghu Chong, the most senior member in the Mount Hua School.
 Brigitte Lin as Dongfang Bubai, the leader of the Sun Moon Holy Cult.
 Michelle Reis as Yue Lingshan, Linghu Chong's junior.
 Rosamund Kwan as Ren Yingying, Linghu Chong's love interest and Ren Woxing's daughter.
 Waise Lee as Hattori Sengun, the rōnin chief and Dongfang Bubai's ally.
 Chin Kar-lok as Sarutobi Kazuki, Hattori's henchman.
 Lau Shun as Xiang Wentian, an elder of the Sun Moon Holy Cult who remains loyal to Ren Woxing.
 Fennie Yuen as Lan Fenghuang, Ren Yingying's subordinate.
 Yen Shi-kwan as Ren Woxing, the former leader of the Sun Moon Holy Cult who was overthrown and imprisoned by Dongfang Bubai.
 Candice Yu as Shishi, Dongfang Bubai's lover.
 Cheung Kwok-leung as Eunuch Hong

Alternative versions

The United States version has nine minutes of the original film cut and was released under the title Legend of the Swordsman. It is dubbed in English and retains the original music score.

The Hong Kong version is in Cantonese and it retains the nine minutes of extended footage and gory violence.

The Taiwanese version, which is dubbed in Mandarin, contains an additional four minutes of rare extended and gory footage that was removed in the United States and Hong Kong releases, bringing the total runtime to 112 minutes. It has some different music scores and features Jet Li's original voice. It has aired on Chinese Television System many times.

Production
In the Mandarin-dubbed version of the film, Rosamund Kwan and Fennie Yuen speak Sichuanese instead of Standard Mandarin. This was meant to enhance the fact that their characters are of the Miao ethnic group.

Music
The original soundtrack album for the film, "Ching Hsia Lin/ Swordsman 2" (traditional Chinese: 東方不敗 － 林青霞 電影音樂紀實; simplified Chinese: 东方不败 －林青霞 电影音乐纪实; pinyin: Dōngfāng bù bài - línqīngxiá diànyǐng yīnyuè jìshí) was released by BMG Music Taiwan in 1992. It contains 20 tracks with 3 sound recordings at the scene.

The theme song from The Swordsman, Chong Hoi Yat Sing Siu, performed in Cantonese by Samuel Hui in the first film, was played in a few scenes in Swordsman II.

Reception

Critical reception 
Brigitte Lin's performance was listed as one of the "Great Performances" by Richard Corliss under TIME magazine's "All-TIME 100 Movies". On review aggregator website Rotten Tomatoes, the film holds an approval rating of 71% based on 7 reviews, with an average rating of 6.79/10.

Box office 
The film grossed HK$34,462,861 at the Hong Kong box office and remains Jet Li's highest-grossing film in Hong Kong to date.

Accolades

References

External links
 
 

1992 films
1992 LGBT-related films
1992 action films
1992 martial arts films
1990s Cantonese-language films
Films based on Chinese novels
Films based on works by Jin Yong
Films directed by Ching Siu-tung
Films set in the Ming dynasty
Hong Kong action films
Hong Kong LGBT-related films
Hong Kong martial arts films
Hong Kong sequel films
Transgender-related films
Works based on The Smiling, Proud Wanderer
Wuxia films
1990s Hong Kong films

ja:スウォーズマン#スウォーズマン／女神伝説の章